Marshall Senior High School is a public high school located in Marshall, Minnesota, United States. The school educates students in grades 9 to 12. This high school received a GreatSchools rating of 7 out of 10 based on the students' test scores. In 2011, the 10th grade reading scores and the 11th grade science scores were both above the state average. However, the 11th grade math scores were 3% below the Minnesota state average.

Administration
This is the administration as of March 9, 2015.
Principal: Brian Jones
Superintendent: Jeremy Williams

Graduation requirements
In order to earn a diploma, students must pass Writing, Reading, and Math GRAD tests. They must also take the Reading and Math Minnesota Comprehensive Assessments.

Students are also required to achieve 30.5 credits in the following areas:
4 credits language (must include English 9 plus 1.5 credits in literature and 1.5 credits in writing)
4 credits social studies (must include Social 9, U.S. History, World Geography, Economics and U.S. Government)
3 credits of math (must include Algebra IB, Geometry, and Algebra II)
3 credits of science (must include Science 9 and Biology)
1 credit of fine arts
1 credit of technology
.5 credits of career education
.5 credits in consumer awareness
1 credit of physical education
.5 credits of health
12.5 credits of electives

Activities
Marshall Senior High School has a variety of activities that teach the athletes skills such as: teamwork, self-discipline, time-management, and dedication. The school offers fine art activities as well as athletic activities.

The fine art programs are:

 Knowledge Bowl
 Business Professionals of America (BPA)
 Future Farmers of America (FFA)
 Student Council
 Year Book
 Math Team
 Band (Pep band, Jazz band, and Marching Band)
 Choir (Show choir, Swing choir, and Roaring Twenties)
 One-Act Play
 Musical (Fall)
 Peer Helpers
 Speech
 Youth as Resources

The athletic activities are:

 Basketball (Boys and Girls)-2001, 2002 Girls State Champions 1963 Boys State Champions
 Baseball (Boys)
 Cross Country (Boys and Girls)-2003, 2004 Boys State Champions
 Dance Team (Girls)
 Football (Boys)
 Golf (Boys and Girls)
 Gymnastics (Girls)
 Hockey (Boys and Girls)
 Soccer (Boys and Girls)
 Softball-Fastpitch (Girls)
 Swimming & Diving (Girls, Boys swim with Montevideo Senior High School)
 Tennis (Girls)
 Track (Boys and Girls)
 Volleyball (Girls)-2004, 2007, 2009, 2011, 2012, 2013 State Champions (https://www.mshsl.org/sites/default/files/2020-12/championship-matches-history-thru-2020.pdf)
 Wrestling (Boys)

The activities have 75% of the student body participating in at least one activity a year. 63% of students who participate are involved in two or more activities. The school has nine Minnesota High School League (MSHSL) Team State Champions and 67 teams compete in MSHSL state tournaments as well as many individuals competing in state tournaments.

Notable alumni 
 Gordon Forbes, Minnesota lawyer and politician
 Walt Jocketty, Major League Baseball General Manager
 Trey Lance, NFL quarterback for the San Francisco 49ers 
 Brandon Swanson, teenager who disappeared on May 14, 2008, and still missing
 Sean Tillman, aka Har Mar Superstar, musician

References

Educational institutions in the United States with year of establishment missing
Public high schools in Minnesota
Schools in Lyon County, Minnesota